Verdi is Andrea Bocelli's seventh studio album and fourth classical album, of Verdi's most famous arias, released in 2000. The Israel Philharmonic Orchestra, conducted by Zubin Mehta, accompanied Bocelli for the album. The album was certified Gold in the US by the Recording Industry Association of America and in Switzerland by IFPI of Switzerland, Platinum in Canada by the Canadian Recording Industry Association, and Double Platinum in the Netherlands by the Nederlandse Vereniging van Producenten en Importeurs van beeld- en geluidsdragers.

Track listing

Charts

Weekly charts

Year-end charts

Certifications

References

Andrea Bocelli albums
Decca Records albums
2000 classical albums
Opera recordings